The 2007 SMU Mustangs football team represented Southern Methodist University (SMU) as a member the West Division of Conference USA (C-USA) during the 2007 NCAA Division I FBS football season. Led by Phil Bennett in his sixth and final season as head coach, the Mustangs compiled an overall record of 1–11 with a mark of 0–8 in conference play, placing last of out of six teams in C-USA's West Division.

The Mustangs scored an average of 28.3 points per game (54th of 119 in FBS) while allowing 39.8 points per game (117th of 119 in FBS).

Previous season
The 2006 team finished with an overall record of 6–6. The team went 4–4 in conference play, finishing in fourth place in the Conference USA's West Division. Despite being bowl eligible the Mustangs were not invited to a bowl game.

Schedule

Roster

Game summaries

Texas Tech

North Texas

at Arkansas State

at TCU

UTEP

at Southern Miss

Tulane

at Tulsa

at Houston

Rice

UCF

at Memphis

References

SMU
SMU Mustangs football seasons
SMU Mustangs football